Bruno Pilaš (21 November 1950 – 11 June 2011) was a Yugoslavian professional footballer who played as a striker in the NASL between 1973 and 1977 for the Toronto Metros-Croatia.

Playing career
Before his arrival to North America he began his career in 1969 with GNK Dinamo Zagreb. In 1971, he went abroad to play in the National Soccer League (NSL) with Toronto Croatia, where he won the NSL Championship.

Managerial career
In 1977, due to chronic injuries he retired from professional football, and embarked upon a coaching career where he managed Toronto Croatia several times in the Canadian Professional Soccer League. In 1987, he served as the head coach for Toronto Croatia in the National Soccer League. In 1993, he managed NSL rivals Toronto Italia.

References

1950 births
2011 deaths
Sportspeople from Zagreb
Association football forwards
Yugoslav footballers
Toronto Blizzard (1971–1984) players
Toronto Croatia players
North American Soccer League (1968–1984) players
Canadian National Soccer League players
Yugoslav expatriate footballers
Expatriate soccer players in Canada
Yugoslav expatriate sportspeople in Canada
Yugoslav football managers
Croatian football managers
Toronto Croatia managers
Canadian Soccer League (1998–present) managers
Canadian National Soccer League coaches
Yugoslav expatriate football managers
Croatian expatriate footballers
Expatriate soccer managers in Canada
Croatian expatriate sportspeople in Canada